Beijing–Shenyang high-speed railway is a -long high-speed rail line of the China Railway High-speed between Beijing and Shenyang, the capital of Liaoning province. It is a section of the Beijing–Harbin high-speed railway.

The line was intended to relieve a significant bottleneck in China's transportation network between the Northeast region and Beijing. The route runs to the north and inland of the existing routes which hug the coast around the Bohai sea. The new line leaves Beijing heading northeast to Chengde in Hebei province then turns east through Chaoyang, and Fuxin in Liaoning province, on route to Shenyang. There are 16 stations, which were the last section of the Beijing–Harbin high-speed railway to be completed; the other sections of that line had been operational since December 1, 2012.

Travel time between Shenyang and Beijing was cut from 4 hours to just 2 hours and 17 minutes.

History

Construction was supposed to have started in 2010 with the project to be completed by 2012, but was delayed  until March 2014.

Protests by residents along the planned route caused several safety reviews to examine the potential noise pollution and electro-magnetic radiation. The first two reviews suggested installing noise shielding along sensitive parts of the line. The third review called for noise shielding, in addition to above ground tunnels, to completely enclose the line while near urban areas. In addition, the starting point has been relocated to Beijing Chaoyang railway station (formerly known as Xinghuo railway station) in Chaoyang District of Beijing.

In August 2013, the Beijing municipal government published a notice calling for bids to build the line until its status is completed and operational. The total investment was expected to be 124.5 billion yuan.

The Shenyang to Chengde South section opened on  December 29, 2018. The remaining section between Chengde South and Beijing Chaoyang opened on January 22, 2021.

On June 25, 2021, G902/903, G907/908 and G915/916 trains were extended to the Beijing railway station, thus the Beijing-Shenyang high-speed railway has charted trains arriving and departing at the Beijing railway station.

Stations

See also
Beijing–Harbin high-speed railway
Qinhuangdao–Shenyang high-speed railway
Beijing–Harbin Railway

References 

High-speed railway lines in China
Rail transport in Beijing
Rail transport in Liaoning
1